Valerio Verre (born 11 January  1994) is an Italian professional footballer who plays as a midfielder for  club Palermo, on loan from Sampdoria.

Club career

Roma, Genoa & Siena
As a graduate of reserve team, Verre signed a five-year contract in May 2012. On 30 July he was involved in the transfer of Mattia Destro (€16 million) from Genoa (€8.5 million) and Siena (€7.5 million), while he and Giammario Piscitella went to Genoa in a co-ownership deal for €1.5 million each. Verre was loaned to the beneficiary Siena for one season, as the club gave up on signing one of them from Roma by signing Eugenio Lamanna from Genoa for €1.5 million.

Verre made his Coppa Italia debut for Siena on 19 August 2012 in a match against Vicenza and scored the match's goal. He wore no.16 shirt.

In June 2013 Roma bought back the two players (Verre tagged for €2.5 million; Piscitella €1.5 million) from Genoa for €1 million cash plus Panagiotis Tachtsidis. (who immediately swapped with Francesco Lodi, both 50% registration rights tagged for €3 million)

Udinese
After returning to Roma in June 2013, Verre was sold to Udinese in a co-ownership agreement for €2.5 million (along with Nicolás López for €1 million) as a part exchange to a transfer deal involving Mehdi Benatia who moved to the Giallorossi for €13.5 million.

Loans to Palermo and Perugia
After training with Udinese, he was loaned out to Serie B club Palermo on 2 September 2013, the final day of the summer transfer window.

On 13 July 2014, Udinese bought Verre outright from Roma for €900,000. On 12 July 2014, Verre left for Serie B newcomer Perugia in a temporary deal. Verre quickly became a first-choice midfielder for Perugia and an integral part of the team along with youngsters Vittorio Parigini, Edoardo Goldaniga, Nicolo Fazzi, and Ivan Provedel. He helped Perugia to a Serie B promotion-playoff and finished the year with five goals and four assists.

Sampdoria
On 31 January 2017, his rights were purchased by Sampdoria who loaned him back to Pescara.

Return to Perugia
On 17 August 2018, Verre joined to Serie B side Perugia on loan with an option to buy.

Loan to Verona
On 10 August 2019, Verre joined Hellas Verona on loan with an option to buy.

Loan to Empoli
On 29 January 2022, Verre moved to Empoli on loan with an option to buy.

Return to Sampdoria and loan to Palermo
After his stint at Empoli, Verre returned to Sampdoria, playing the first half of the club's 2022–23 Serie A campaign with the Blucerchiati and being regularly featured in the starting lineup.

On 27 January 2023, Palermo announced to have signed Verre on loan from Sampdoria until the end of the season, with an option to buy.

International career
After being part of the Italy U16 and U17 national teams, he began playing in the Italy U18 under the technical guidance of Alberigo Evani, who handed him the captain's armband despite being under age.

On 3 October 2013, he received his first call up to the Italy U21 team, for 2013 UEFA European Under-21 Football Championship qualification match against Belgium on 14 October. He has since been called up to the Italy U21 team for multiple times. On 12 August 2015, he made his debut with the Italy U21 team, in a friendly match against Hungary.

Career statistics

Honours
Roma youth
Campionato Nazionale Primavera: 2010–11
Campionato Allievi Nazionali: 2009–10

Palermo
Serie B: 2013–14

References

1994 births
Living people
Italian footballers
Association football midfielders
Italy under-21 international footballers
Italy youth international footballers
Genoa C.F.C. players
A.C.N. Siena 1904 players
Udinese Calcio players
Palermo F.C. players
A.C. Perugia Calcio players
Delfino Pescara 1936 players
U.C. Sampdoria
A.C. Perugia Calcio
Hellas Verona F.C. players
Empoli F.C. players
Serie A players
Serie B players